"Pilot" (also known as "The Critic") is the first episode of the first season of the U.S. animated TV show The Critic, a series created by The Simpsons writers Al Jean and Mike Reiss which ran for the 1994 season. The episode was animated by Film Roman, and aired on ABC.

Production
The A.V. Club explains "in creating The Critic, Al Jean and Mike Reiss set out to make the show as dissimilar from The Simpsons as humanly possible".

The character of Jay Sherman is "the butt of many of the jokes on The Critic but he's also an extraordinarily accomplished figure". For this reason the show needed to find the right balance between the two. The A.V. Club explains that "the pilot episode of The Critic errs on the side of making him seem altogether too accomplished".

The opening sequence, first seen in the pilot, "elegantly establishes the world Jay lives in, a world where, in the parlance of Jeff Daniels in The Squid and the Whale, people read books and see interesting movies and care about art and ideas".

Plot
According to TV.com, the synopsis is "When Jay has actress, Valerie Fox, on his show, they both fall in love with each other and get involved in a caring relationship. A relationship that may be threatened if Jay pans her performance in her new movie."

Cast
Cast reads as follows:
 Jon Lovitz as Jay Sherman and Woody Allen
 Nancy Cartwright as Margo and additional voices
 Christine Cavanaugh as Marty Sherman and additional voices
 Jennifer Lien as Valerie Fox
 Gerrit Graham as Franklin Sherman
 Doris Grau as Doris Grossman 
 Judith Ivey as Elanor Sherman
 Gene Shalit as himself
 Nick Jameson as Vlada Veramirovich and additional voices
 Maurice LaMarche as Jeremy Hawke and additional voices
 Charles Napier as Duke Phillips
 Kath Soucie as various characters
 Brenda Vaccaro as Ardeth
 Margaret Cho

Gags
 Phone gag: "Jay, this is your mother.  Your father and I are taking you out of our will.  We feel you already have enough money. Oh yes, and happy birthday."
 TV gag: A parody of Alien 3 - an alien head with another alien head inside its mouth comes out to frighten a woman.  The alien head kisses the woman and she smiles.
 Theater gag: Jay says "Get away, Zitface!"

Cultural references
The movie spoofs/parodies in this episode include:
 Family Affair: The Motion Picture (Family Affair)
 Home Alone 5 (Home Alone)
 Rabbi PI (Magnum PI)
 Crocodile Gandhi (Crocodile Dundee)
 Kiss of Death (Touch of Death)

Critical reception
The A.V. Club notes "Watching The Critic in 2011 is an exercise in nostalgia: the very first image is of the World Trade Center’s Twin Towers resting high atop the rest of a now sadly outdated New York skyline." It explains that "many of the episode’s sharpest gags pit Jay’s battered dignity against a world that never stops mocking him [and] Jon Lovitz...gives the character a perpetually wounded dignity that’s incongruously hilarious". It says "the big problem with the series’ pilot lies with the character of the starlet/girlfriend/actress", arguing that she is merely a "plotpoint rather than a flesh and blood character, a way of compromising Jay’s ethics rather than an autonomous human being". It adds "like pretty much all première episodes, The Critic has a lot to unpack. It’s not as quick or as dense as it could be because it has characters to introduce and a rich, lovely, and multi-faceted milieu to introduce", but says "the show had a strong, clear voice and sensibility from the very beginning. It knew exactly what it wanted to do and how it wanted to do it".

Nielsen ratings
The original airing of the episode easily won its timeslot, earning a 15.5 household rating and a 23 percent audience share, ranking 16th out of 92 programs that week, and was watched by 26.5 million viewers.

DVD release
The episode was included in the 2004 DVD release of The Critic. The commentary was performed by creators/executive producers/writers Mike Reiss and Al Jean, actors Maurice LaMarche and Nick Jameson and director Rich Moore.

References

External links 
 

1994 American television episodes
The Critic
Critic, The
Television episodes set in New York City